Lashon hara (or loshon horo, or loshon hora) ("evil tongue") is the halakhic term for speech about a person or persons that is negative or harmful to them, even though it is true. It is speech that damages the person(s) that are talked about either emotionally or financially, or lowers them in the estimation of others. Lashon hara differs from the more severe prohibition of hotzaat shem ra, "making a bad name," in that hotzaat shem ra consists of untrue statements.

Lashon hara is considered to be a very serious sin in the Jewish tradition. The communicator of lashon hara (which is included in rechilut) violates the Torah prohibition of lo telech rachil b'ameicha, translating to "thou shalt not go up and down as a  among thy people" (Leviticus 19:16 KJV).

Definition
Speech is considered to be lashon hara (detraction) if it says something negative about a person or party, is not seriously intended to correct or improve a negative situation, and is true. Statements that fit this description are considered to be lashon hara, regardless of the method of communication that is used, whether it is through face-to-face conversation, a letter, telephone, or email, or even body language.

By contrast, hotzaat shem ra ("spreading a bad name") – also called hotzaat diba or motzi shem ra (lit. "putting out a bad name") – consists of lies, and is best translated as "slander" or "defamation" (calumny). Hotzaat shem ra is an even graver sin than lashon hara.

The act of gossiping is called rechilut, and is also forbidden by halakha.

Etymology
The phrase consists of the noun  ("tongue"), the definite article , and the adjective  ("evil"). The Hebrew noun  means "tongue" and – as in many languages – "speech" or "language". The phrase is generally translated as "evil speech". The term corresponds to the idea of an "evil tongue" in other cultures, such as the Latin , the French , and the Spanish .

Sources

The term lashon hara is not mentioned in the Tanakh, but "keep thy tongue from evil" occurs in Psalm 34:14. The Biblical curse on one who "strikes his fellow in secret" is understood by the rabbis to refer to lashon hara, as it is a form of harming a person without their knowledge.

The Talmud lists lashon hara as one of the causes of the Biblical malady of tzaraath. Elsewhere, it declares that habitual speakers of lashon hara are not tolerated in God's presence. Similar strong denouncements can be found in various places in Jewish literature.

In Numbers chapter 12, Miriam gossips with her brother Aaron, questioning why Moses is more qualified to lead the Jewish people than anyone else. God hears and strikes her down with tzaraath. Miriam had to stay outside of the camp for a week due to the tzaraath. During this time, all of Israel waited for her.

Chafetz Chaim
Rabbi Yisrael Meir Kagan wrote two major halakhic works on the evil tongue: Chafetz Chaim ("Desirer of Life") and Shmirat HaLashon ("Guarding the tongue"), both 1873. The Chafetz Chaim lists 31 speech-related commandments mentioned in the Torah. An English adaptation, Guard Your Tongue (2002), anthologizes the teachings of these two books.

Baalei lashon hara
The expression baalei lashon hara literally means "masters of evil tongue", and it refers to habitual speakers of lashon hara. The serious prohibition of communicating lashon harah relates foremost to somebody who incidentally did so. Someone who makes it his habit to talk lashon harah about others ("did you hear ...", "do you already know ...", etc.) is called a ba'al lashon hara. By repeatedly communicating so, lashon hara became an integral part of this person, and his/her sins are far more severe, because this person regularly creates a chillul Hashem, a "desecration of the name of HaShem". Lashon hara, rechilut and motzi shem ra are not accepted social tools in Judaism, because such behavior cuts the person who does in this manner off from many good things in the world around them. It is often phrased that one should stay away from people who communicate lashon hara, because any day, one will almost certainly become an object of derogatory communication by the same people.

Exceptions
There are times when a person is permitted or even required to disclose information whether or not the information is disparaging. For instance, if a person’s intent in sharing negative information is for a to’elet, a positive, constructive, and beneficial purpose that may serve as a warning to prevent harm or injustice, the prohibition against lashon hara does not apply. Hotzaat shem ra, spouting lies and spreading disinformation, is always prohibited. It is important to note that even with positive intentions, there are many important limitations regarding when it is permitted to speak lashon hara.

See also
 Chofetz Chaim
 Public disclosure of private facts (legally recognized by many U.S. jurisdictions as constituting actionable injury)

References

External links

 Benjamin Brown, 'From Principles to Rules and from Musar to Halakhah - The Hafetz Hayim's Rulings on Libel and Gossip'
 Translation of Sefer Shmiras HaLashon
 Let Them Talk: The Mitzvah to Speak Lashon Hara by Rabbi Mark Dratch, JSafe
 A primer on how to raise our children to look at the positive and speak well about others
 31 mitzvot of speech
 Hilchot Lashon Hara (L"H)
 Negative Speech (Lashon Hora) | Chabad.org
 Finding Your Zivug or Mate Loshon Hora and Information-Seeking in Shidduchim

Defamation
Jewish ethical law
Negative Mitzvoth
Hebrew words and phrases in Jewish law

yi:לשון הרע